Uroš II may refer to:

 Uroš II, Grand Prince of Serbia, Grand Prince of Serbia (1145-1162)
 Stefan Uroš II, King of Serbia (1282-1321)

See also
 Uroš I (disambiguation)
 Stefan Uroš (disambiguation)
 Uroš Nemanjić (disambiguation)
 Uroš Vukanović (disambiguation)
 Serbia (disambiguation)